Obovatol is a biphenolic anti-inflammatory, anxiolytic, and nootropic isolated from the bark of Magnolia obovata. It is a biphenyl lignan.

References 

Anxiolytics
GABAA receptor positive allosteric modulators
Nootropics
lignans